The Solomons robin (Petroica polymorpha) is a species of bird in the family Petroicidae. It is found in the Solomon Islands.

Its natural habitat is subtropical or tropical moist montane forests and subalpine shrubland.

Subspecies

References

 

Solomons robin
Birds of the Solomon Islands
Endemic fauna of the Solomon Islands
Solomons robin
Solomons robin
Endemic birds of the Solomon Islands